The 15th Annual Japan Record Awards took place at the Imperial Garden Theater in Chiyoda, Tokyo, on December 31, 1973, starting at 7:00PM JST. The primary ceremonies were televised in Japan on TBS.

Award winners 
Japan Record Award
Hiroshi Itsuki for "Yozora"
 Lyricist: Yoko Yamaguchi
 Composer: Masaaki Hirao
 Arranger: Kouji Ryuuzaki
 Record Company: Minoruphone/Tokuma Japan
Best Vocalist
Saori Yuki for "Koibumi"
Best New Artist
Junko Sakurada for "Watashi No Aoi Tori"
Vocalist Award
Hideki Saijo for "Chigireta Ai"
Aki Yashiro for "Namida Koi"
Cherish for "Shiroi Guitar"
New Artist Award
Miyoko Asada for "Akai Fussen"
Maria Anzai for "Namida No Taiyō"
Shizue Abe for "Coffee Shop De"
Agnes Chan for "Sougen No Kagayaki"
General Public Award
Megumi Asaoka for "Watashi No Kare Wa Hidarikiki"
Last year's best new artist.
Garo for "Romance"
Kenji Sawada for "Kikenna Futari"
Lyricist Award
Yū Aku for "Johnny He No Dengon", "Jinjin Sasete" and "Machi No Akari"
Singer: Pedro & Capricious, Linda Yamamoto and Masaaki Sakai
Composer Award
Keisuke Hama for "Soshite,Koube" and "Machi No Akari"
Singer: Hiroshi Uchiyamada and Cool Five and Masaaki Sakai
Arranger Award
Kouji Ryuuzaki for "Wakaba No Sasayaki"
Singer: Mari Amachi
Planning Award
CBS Sony for "Tanin No Kankei"
Singer: Katsuko Kanai
King Records for "Hachiro Kasuga Enka 100 Sen"
Singer: Hachiro Kasuga
Awarded after 2 years, 4th planning award.
Children's Song Award
Keita Dai for "Mama To Boku No Shiki"
Special Award
Tetsuo Maruyama & Nippon Columbia
King Records
Nippon Columbia
Awarded after 3 years.
Masato Fujida
Hamako Watanabe 
Song: Ieraishiang
15th Anniversary Commemorative Award
Naomi Sagara 
1967 New Artist Award & 1969 Japan Record Award
Theme:  Sekkai Wa Futari No Tameni 
Shinichi Mori 
1969 & 1971 Best Vocalist, 1970 Vocalist Award
Theme: Minatomachi Blues
Harumi Miyako 
1964 New Artist Award
Theme: Anko Tsubaki Wa Koi No Hana
Saburo Kitajima 
1962 New Artist Award
Theme: Hakodate No Hito
Yukio Hashi 
1960 New Artist Award, 1962 & 1966 Japan Record Award
Theme: Itakogasa
Frank Nagai 
1959 & 1963 Vocalist Award, 1961 Japan Record Award
Theme: Kimi Koishi
Hibari Misora 
1960 Vocalist Award & 1965 Japan Record Award
Theme: Yawara
Hiroshi Mizuhara 
1959 Japan Record Award & 1967 Vocalist Award
Theme: Kuroi Hana Bira
The Peanuts 
Theme: Koi No Vacation
Kiyoko Suizenji 
1969 General Public Award
Theme: 365 Ho No March
Teruhiko Saigō 
1964 New Artist Award
Theme: Jyu Nana O No Kono Mune Ni
Mina Aoe 
1968 & 1969 Vocalist Award
Theme: Isezakicho Blues

See also 
24th NHK Kōhaku Uta Gassen

External links
Official Website

Japan Record Awards
Japan Record Awards
Japan Record Awards
Japan Record Awards
1973